Radek Hochmeister (born 6 September 1982) is a professional football defender who has played in the Czech First League for various clubs.

External links
 
 
 

Living people
Czech footballers
Czech Republic under-21 international footballers
1982 births
Association football defenders
Czech First League players
FC Slovan Liberec players
FK Jablonec players
SK Kladno players
SK Sigma Olomouc players
FC Viktoria Plzeň players
FC Hradec Králové players
FK Bohemians Prague (Střížkov) players
Footballers from Prague